Justice Johns may refer to:

Charles A. Johns, associate justice of the Oregon Supreme Court
Kensey Johns (judge), chief justice of the Delaware Supreme Court